Trypeta immaculata is a species of tephritid or fruit flies in the genus Trypeta of the family Tephritidae.

Distribution
This species is widespread in most of Europe (Austria, Belgium, Czech Republic, Denmark, Finland, France, Germany, Ireland, Italy, Norway, Poland, Romania, Slovakia, Sweden, Switzerland and The Netherlands).

Description
These fruit flies have the hind femurs without any strong anteroventral subapical setae. The first  flagellomere is apically rounded. Head shows two pairs of orbital setae.

Male without greatly enlarged frontal setae, and frons never extended forwards.

Biology
Adults can be found from mid. June to mid. August. Larvae are present in July and September–October.

These fruit flies are almost oligophagous of Asteraceae plants. Main host plants are Aposeris foetida, Crepis paludosa, Hieracium species, Hypochaeris species, Lactuca muralis, Lapsana communis, Leontodon hispidus, Picris hieracioides, Pilosella officinarum, Prenanthes species, Scorzoneroides autumnalis, Senecio vulgaris, Sonchus arvensis, Taraxacum officinale. In the host plants larvae form leaf mines,

References

External links

Biolib
 Forum Diptera.info
 Natura Mediterraneo
 Fugleognatur

immaculata
Articles containing video clips